Ashlee Renee Holland (born June 18, 1979) is an American actress, dancer, model, and most recent winner of I Wanna Be a Soap Star.  She has appeared on Days of Our Lives as a result of her win.

Born in Portland, Oregon, Holland is the daughter of Al Holland, former Major League Baseball relief pitcher who played for the Phillies, Yankees and Pirates. She was raised in Roanoke, Virginia. In October 2007, Holland won the reality TV contest I Wanna Be a Soap Star over hundreds of wannabe actors to get the part on the popular soap Days of Our Lives. She was the first woman to win this contest. She has appeared in numerous music videos and commercials. She appeared in such films as Torque, The Hot Chick and Honey. She co-hosted Di Media Online's grand opening gala at Level 3 in Hollywood She is also the host in the 2005 music trivia DVD game Shout About Music.

Originally slated to start work immediately after the finale of Soap Star, Ashlee's start date was pushed back.  According to sources, 

Ashlee went on to appear as Crystal Miller in Days of our Lives, however she was not picked up as a permanent castmate and left the soap in early 2008.

Filmography

Commercials
Lincoln Mercury "Men of Mariner" (2005)
Verizon "Tech Makeover" (2005)
Wendy's "My Burger" (2005)
Old Navy "Coffee House" (2004)

References

External links
Ashlee Holland's Official Website
 

American soap opera actresses
People from Roanoke, Virginia
1979 births
Holland, Ashley
21st-century American women